The Battle of Dara was fought between the Eastern Roman Empire and the Sasanians in 530 AD. It was one of the battles of the Iberian War.

Procopius's account of this engagement is among the most detailed descriptions of a late Roman battle.

Background

The Byzantine Empire was at war with the Sassanids from 527, supposedly because Kavadh I had tried to force the Iberians to become Zoroastrians. The Iberian king fled from Kavadh, but Kavadh tried to make peace with the Byzantines, and attempted to have Justin I adopt his son Khosrau. Justin agreed, but on the terms that he would do so only in a rite reserved for barbarians. This failed to satisfy Kavadh, who attacked Byzantine allies, so Justin sent his generals Sittas and Belisarius into Persia, where they were initially defeated. In 529, the failed negotiations of Justin's successor Justinian prompted a Sassanian expedition of 40,000 men towards Dara. The next year, Belisarius was sent back to the region alongside Hermogenes and an army; Kavadh answered with another 10,000 troops under the general Perozes, who set up camp about five kilometers away at Ammodius, in the near vicinity of Dara.

Deployment
The Persians, outnumbering the Romans by 15,000 men, deployed around 20 stades away from the town of Daras and drew up their battle lines.
Despite being outnumbered, Belisarius decided to give battle. He dug a number of ditches to block the Persian cavalry, leaving gaps between them to allow a counterattack. According to Irfan Shahid, the tactic was adopted from the Persians at the Battle of Thannuris two years earlier. These were pushed forward on either flank of his position, while his center was refused back. Here he placed his unreliable infantry behind the center ditch, being placed close enough to the walls of the fortress to provide supporting fire from the city battlements. On the left and right flanks were the Byzantine cavalry, of questionable quality. Supporting them on their interior flanks were small bodies of Huns: 300 Hun cavalry under Sunicas and Aigan supporting the left; and as many more Huns on the right under Simmas and Ascan. Belisarius also placed a body of Heruli cavalry under Pharas in ambush position off his left flank. A reserve composed of his own bucellarii household cavalry was held behind his center and commanded by John the Armenian, his trusted lieutenant and boyhood friend.

Battle
On the first day, according to Procopius, there was no general engagement, but instead a series of challenge fights between champions of both sides. One particular combat involved a Persian knight, who challenged Belisarius to single combat; but was instead met by a Byzantine bath slave named Andreas. Andreas, who had been secretly training with Belisarius' own household troopers, killed not only this Persian champion, but also a second challenger later in the day. The Persians then withdrew to Ammodius for the night. Some authors, however, have expressed doubt as to the pure historicity of Procopius' account and state that while instances of single combat did likely occur during the course of the battle, Procopius' description is intended to be a narrative device rather than a factual account. Another source, believed to be based on official documents, does indeed reference individual combat, but makes no mention of Andreas and, furthermore, places any single combat engagements at a different stage of the battle.

After the first day of skirmishes, Belisarius sent a letter to the Persian commander. Rather than fight a battle, he believed it was best to avoid conflict and instead insisted that their disputes be settled by discussion. The letter read, "The first blessing is peace, as is agreed by all men who have even a small share of reason. ... The best general, therefore, is that one which is able to bring about peace from war." The letter either fell on deaf ears or Perozes already wanted to negotiate which eventually failed, the battle resumed. The Persians already thought of the Byzantine army as a second-rate army; this letter, along with his numerical superiority, likely made Perozes even more confident of victory. In his book on Belisarius Brogna merely says that Belisarius sent the letter because of his good moral character. Mahon claims in his book that Belisarius doubted his chance of victory and this is why he sent the letter.  

On the second day of the battle, 10,000 more Persian troops arrived from Nisibis. The Sassanid and Byzantine light infantry exchanged fire resulting in minor casualties on each side. As Procopius describes, "At first, then, both sides discharged arrows against each other, and the  missiles by their great number made, as it were, a  vast cloud; and many men were falling on both sides,  but the missiles of the barbarians flew much more  thickly. For fresh men were always fighting in turn,  affording to their enemy not the slightest opportunity  to observe what was being done; but even so the  Romans did not have the worst of it. For a steady  wind blew from their side against the barbarians, and  checked to a considerable degree the force of their  arrows." Either the Persians got the best of the Romans, the fight was fairly equal or the Persians suffered more. Then the Persians formed two lines: the right flank under Pityaxes and the left under Baresmanas.

The first wave of the Persian attack was directed against the Byzantine left flank. The Persians forced a crossing of the ditch, pushing back the Byzantine cavalry. But the intervention of Sunicas' Huns attacking from the interior of the Byzantine line, as well as Pharas' Herulians attacking out of ambush from the opposite side, forced the Persians' wing to retreat.

The Persians then attacked the Byzantine right wing, where Perozes sent the Sassanid Zhayedan, also known as the Immortals, who were the elite Persian armored lancers. The Byzantine cavalry and infantry defending the ditch were pushed back here as they had been on the right. But Belisarius counterattacked with his reserve Bucellari cavalry, and split the Persian troops in two. Half the Persians pursued the Byzantine cavalry, but the rest were trapped, and Baresmanas was killed along with 5,000 other men. The Byzantine cavalry also recovered and routed their pursuers. Belisarius allowed a pursuit for a few miles, but let the majority of Persian survivors escape.

Aftermath
Following the defeat, the Sasanians under Spahbod Azarethes together with their client Lakhmids started another invasion, this time, unexpectedly, via Commagene. Belisarius foiled their plan by swift maneuvering and forced the Persians, who were retreating, into a heavy battle at Callinicum in which the Byzantines were defeated, but with heavy casualties on both sides. The Byzantines eventually paid tributes in exchange for a peace treaty.

In 540 and 544 Dara was attacked by Khosrau I, who was unable to take it either time. Khosrau finally captured it in 573; its fall was said to have caused Justin II to go insane. Justin's wife Sophia and his friend Tiberius Constantine took control of the empire until Justin died in 578. Meanwhile, the Persians were able to march further into the empire, but Khosrau died in 579.

Maurice defeated the Persians at Dara in 586 and recaptured the fortress, but the Persians under Khosrau II defeated the Byzantines in 604. This time Persians destroyed the city, but the Byzantines later rebuilt it in 628. In 639 the Muslim Arabs captured it, and it remained in their hands until 942 when it was sacked by the Byzantines. It was sacked again by John I Tzimiskes in 958, but the Byzantines never recaptured it.

The battle in literature and media
The Battle of Dara is described in detail in, "Archaeological and Ancient Literary Evidence for a Battle near Dara Gap, Turkey, AD 530: Topography, Texts & Trenches" - see sources below. It was depicted in 2005 in the TV series Time Commanders. 
The battle is described in detail in the 1938 novel "Count Belisarius" by Robert Graves. It is also mentioned in the 2006 novel Belisarius: The First Shall Be Last. Dara, as well as Callinicum, are scenes in "Immortal: A Novel of Belisarius" by William Havelock.
The battle is also featured in Total War: Attila, a strategy game from 2015, as playable battle in The Roman Expedition DLC pack, alongside the battle of Ad Decimum.

Citation

Sources
Procopius, History of the Wars, book I, chapter xiii.
Warren Treadgold, History of the Byzantine State and Society. Stanford (California): Stanford University Press, 1997.
John Haldon, The Byzantine Wars. Stroud: The History Press, 2008.
Christopher Lillington-Martin, "Archaeological and Ancient Literary Evidence for a Battle near Dara Gap, Turkey, AD 530: Topography, Texts & Trenches", British Archaeological Reports (BAR) –S1717, 2007 The Late Roman Army in the Near East from Diocletian to the Arab Conquest Proceedings of a colloquium held at Potenza, Acerenza and Matera, Italy (May 2005) edited by Ariel S. Lewin and Pietrina Pellegrini with the aid of Zbigniew T. Fiema and Sylvain Janniard. . (pages 299–311).
 B.H. Liddell Hart, Strategy. London: G. Bell & Sons, 1929.

530
Battles of the Roman–Sasanian Wars
530s conflicts
530s in the Byzantine Empire
6th century in Iran
History of Mardin Province
Iberian War